Fazuelos, fijuelas, hiuelas, deblas, or orecchie di Ammon are Sephardic Jewish pastries of thin fried dough. In Sephardic tradition, they are eaten at Purim; the Italian name recalls the shape of Haman's ears, similarly to the Hebrew name for hamantashen, oznei Haman.

Fazuelo are made by frying a thin dough of flour and eggs. Turkish Jews add brandy to the dough and Moroccan Jews eat them with cinnamon and syrup. They are similar to Andalusian Pestiños, but the latter are eaten with honey.

See also
 Sephardi Jewish cuisine

References

Sephardi Jewish cuisine
Purim foods